Autocesta Rijeka – Zagreb was a Croatian state-owned joint-stock company founded pursuant to decision of the government of the Republic of Croatia of December 11, 1997, to facilitate construction and subsequent management of a motorway between Rijeka and Zagreb.

The company started operating on March 15, 1998. The company issued 21,520 shares, nominally valued at 100,000.00 Croatian kuna each. All company stocks are owned by the Republic of Croatia.

The company was granted the motorway management concession for a period of 28 years, which has subsequently been expanded to include not only the A6 motorway and some sections of the A1 motorway, but also the A7 motorway and the Krk Bridge on the D102 state road. The expansion of the concession also included extension of the concession period to 32 years and 11 months.

The company managed the following routes before January 1st 2021:

In 2018, the company became managed by a supervisory board.

On 21 May 2020, the Croatian Government announced that the company be incorporated into Hrvatske autoceste.

The company was acquired by Hrvatske autoceste and ceased to exist on midnight of January 1st 2021. All previously managed routes are now managed by the acquirer.

See also 
 Highways in Croatia
 Hrvatske autoceste
 Hrvatske ceste

References

External links 
  

Transport companies of Croatia
Companies established in 1998
1998 establishments in Croatia